Pimelea sulphurea is a plant in the Thymelaeaceae family.

Description
Pimelea sulphurea (Yellow banjine) is a small shrub from 15–60 cm high. Its stems are smooth (glabrous) and its elliptic to circular leaves are opposite, and without stalks (sessile - the leaves attaching directly to the stem), and of length 2–16 mm, width 1.5–9 mm. Both surfaces of the leaves are smooth and of a green to bluish green colour. The inflorescence hangs down (is pendulous), and is compact, with many flowers. The yellow flowers are usually bisexual, but sometimes female only. They are hairy outside and smooth inside. P. sulphurea flowers from July to November.

Habitat
It usually grows on sand, within woodland or shrubland.

Distribution
The species occurs in the south-west of Western Australia, in the IBRA regions of Avon Wheatbelt, Coolgardie, Esperance Plains, Geraldton Sandplains, Jarrah Forest, Mallee, and the Swan Coastal Plain.

Taxonomy
The species was  described by C.D.F. Meisner in 1848. In 1852, Walpers assigned it to Meyer's genus of Calyptrostegia (now considered a synonym of Pimelea) thereby giving it the name, Calyptrostegia sulphurea. In 1891, Otto Kuntze redescribed Pimelea as being the genus Banksia and hence gave it (incorrectly) the name Banksia sulfurea.

References

External links
AVH: Occurrence data for Pimelea sulphurea. Australasian Virtual Herbarium. Retrieved 31 August 2018.

sulphurea
Malvales of Australia
Plants described in 1848
Taxa named by Carl Meissner